Ab Bandan Nonush (also Romanized as Āb Bandān Nonūsh; also known as Ābandān Sar and Āb Bandān Sar) is a village in Sajjadrud Rural District, Bandpey-ye Sharqi District, Babol County, Mazandaran Province, Iran. At the 2006 census, its population was 47, in 11 families.

References 

Populated places in Babol County